Autoroute 31 (A-31) is an Autoroute in the region of Lanaudière in Quebec. Constructed in 1966, A-31 primarily links Joliette with A-40 and in turn to Montreal, Trois-Rivières, and other points served by Quebec's autoroute system. It is multiplexed with Route 131 for its entire length.

A-31 carries the name Autoroute Antonio-Barrette, named for a politician from Joliette who briefly served as Premier of Quebec in 1960.

Route description
A-31 begins just south of its interchange with A-40 in Lavaltrie. Motorists exiting A-40 can choose to head north on A-31/Route 131 or south on Route 131 alone to Lavaltrie's city centre. The A-31/A-40 interchange has an unusual configuration, built to accommodate tollbooths that were dismantled.

The freeway runs through farmland for much of its length, with exits at km 2, km 7 and km 12 to serve local roads.

A-31 ends at km 15 at a cloverleaf interchange with Route 158. Plans for Quebec's autoroute system initially called for A-31 to meet A-50 at this interchange. Anticipating this outcome, Route 158 in the immediate vicinity of the interchange was constructed as a limited-access highway and signed as A-50. Once plans to extend the A-50 east of the A-15 were abandoned in the 1980s, this stretch of highway was redesignated Route 158. A series of deadly accidents on Route 158 prompted a 2014 petition drive to reconstruct the highway to Autoroute standards and return the designation of A-50.

Motorists exiting A-31 at km 15 may continue on Route 158 west to Saint-Esprit, Route 158 east to Berthierville, or Route 131 north to Saint-Félix-de-Valois. Past this interchange, A-31 ends and becomes Boulevard Dollard, which continues into downtown Joliette.

Exit list

References

External links 

 Transports Quebec Map 

31
Joliette
Roads in Lanaudière